The Barringer Medal recognizes outstanding work in the field of impact cratering and/or work that has led to a better understanding of impact phenomena. The Barringer Medal and Award were established to honor the memory of D. Moreau Barringer Sr. and his son D. Moreau Barringer Jr. and are sponsored by the Barringer Crater Company. The medal is awarded by the Meteoritical Society. The senior Barringer was the first to seriously propose an impact origin for the crater that now bears his name.

Barringer Medal Winners
The first recipient, Eugene Shoemaker, co-discovered Comet Shoemaker–Levy 9 and was the first to offer accepted proof of Barringer Crater’s meteoritic origin.

See also

 List of astronomy awards
 Glossary of meteoritics

References

Astronomy prizes
Meteorite prizes
Awards established in 1984